Cal Tjader-Stan Getz Sextet is an album by vibraphonist Cal Tjader and saxophonist Stan Getz recorded in 1958 and first released on the Fantasy label.

Reception

The Allmusic review awarded the album 4½ stars calling it "A recommended title for both Getz and Tjader fans".

Track listing
All compositions by Cal Tjader except where noted.
 "I've Grown Accustomed to Her Face" (Frederick Loewe, Alan Jay Lerner) - 3:59
 "For All We Know" (J. Fred Coots, Sam M. Lewis) - 5:45
 "Ginza Samba" (Vince Guaraldi) - 10:57
 "Crow's Nest" - 8:18
 "Liz-Anne" - 3:47
 "Big Bear" - 4:33
 "My Buddy" (Walter Donaldson, Gus Kahn) - 5:14

Personnel 
Cal Tjader - vibraphone
Stan Getz - tenor saxophone
Vince Guaraldi - piano
Eddie Duran - guitar
Scott LaFaro - bass
Billy Higgins - drums

References 

1958 albums
Cal Tjader albums
Stan Getz albums
Fantasy Records albums